Kujama is the Chikun Local Government Area headquarters, in southern Kaduna state in the Middle Belt region of Nigeria. The postal code of the area is 800. It has a population of about 12,967.

See also
 List of villages in Kaduna State

References

Populated places in Kaduna State